Euseboides is a genus of longhorn beetles of the subfamily Lamiinae, containing the following species:

 Euseboides matsudai Gressitt, 1938
 Euseboides plagiatoides Breuning, 1950
 Euseboides plagiatus Gahan, 1893
 Euseboides tonkinensis Breuning, 1973
 Euseboides truncatipennis Breuning, 1949

References

Desmiphorini